Moings is a former commune in the Charente-Maritime department in southwestern France. On 1 January 2016, it was merged into the new commune Réaux-sur-Trèfle.

Population

See also
Communes of the Charente-Maritime department

References

Former communes of Charente-Maritime
Charente-Maritime communes articles needing translation from French Wikipedia
Populated places disestablished in 2016